Wassim Anwar Al-Qattan (born March 4, 1976), also known as Wassim Qattan, is a Syrian businessman who holds several contracts with the Government of Syria to develop government-owned shopping malls and hotel properties in Damascus, Syria. He is President of the Rural Damascus Chamber of Commerce. He is reportedly close to Maher al-Assad, the brother of Syrian president Bashar al-Assad.

In February 2020, the European Union sanctioned Al-Qattan for providing material support to the Syrian government. In July 2020, the US Department of Treasury sanctioned Wassim Al-Qattan and entities associated with him for "providing material assistance in support of the Government of Syria."  The Treasury alleged that Mr. al-Qattan has ties to regime figures and holds several contracts with the Syrian government to invest in and manage government-owned shopping malls and hotels in Damascus. Al-Qattan's reaction to the US Treasury sanctions was to celebrate on Facebook, describing them as a "third package of medals". He is also sanctioned by the UK Treasury.

Background 
Wassim Al-Qattan is a Sunni from Damascus, Syria. Before 2011, he worked in an administrative position in Syriatel. In 2017, Al-Qattan was assigned the management contract of the Qassioum Shopping Mall, at an annual cost of SYB 1.2 billion. In 2018, the Syrian Ministry of Tourism awarded him a 45-year contract to develop prime real estate in Damascus, and management of the Massa Plaza mall.

References 

Syrian individuals subject to U.S. Department of the Treasury sanctions
1976 births
Living people
Syrian businesspeople
Sanctioned due to Syrian civil war
Syrian oligarchs

Syrian individuals subject to the European Union sanctions
Syrian individuals subject to United Kingdom sanctions
Syrian Sunni Muslims